Liolaemus tandiliensis is a species of lizard in the family Iguanidae or the family Liolaemidae. The species is endemic to Argentina.

References

tandiliensis
Lizards of South America
Reptiles of Argentina
Endemic fauna of Argentina
Reptiles described in 2008
Taxa named by Laura Estela Vega
Taxa named by Patricio Juan Bellagamba